Owen Hulland (born 4 September 1999) is an Australian professional basketball player who last played for the South Adelaide Panthers of NBL1 Central. He played college basketball for the Hawaii Rainbow Warriors.

Born in Adelaide, South Australia, Hulland attended UC Senior Secondary College Lake Ginninderra in Canberra, Australian Capital Territory. He played in the South East Australian Basketball League (SEABL) for Basketball Australia's Centre of Excellence for two years. Hulland committed to play for the Hawaii Rainbow Warriors in 2017. He suffered from a foot injury that limited him to just eight games as a freshman during the 2018–19 season. Hulland scored 14 points against the UCLA Bruins on 28 November 2018. He underwent foot surgery before the start of the 2019–20 season that caused him to miss 17 games.

On 21 May 2020, Hulland announced that he was leaving the Rainbow Warriors to embark on a professional career in Australia. On 7 January 2021, he signed as a development player with the Adelaide 36ers for the 2020–21 NBL season. 36ers head coach Conner Henry stated that Hulland had left an impression on the players and coaching staff during training sessions with the team. On 30 March 2021, the South Adelaide Panthers announced the signing with Hulland.

References

External links
College statistics
NBL profile

1999 births
Living people
Adelaide 36ers players
Australian expatriate basketball people in the United States
Australian men's basketball players
Basketball players from Adelaide
Forwards (basketball)
Hawaii Rainbow Warriors basketball players
People educated at Lake Ginninderra College
20th-century Australian people
21st-century Australian people